Jim Grabb and Richey Reneberg were the defending champions but lost in the final 6–2, 6–3 to Patrick McEnroe and Jonathan Stark.

Seeds
All eight seeded teams received byes to the second round.

Draw

Finals

Top half

Bottom half

External links
1992 Australian Indoor Championships Doubles Draw

Doubles